College Rifles Rugby Union Football & Sports Club are a rugby union club based in Auckland, New Zealand. The club was established in 1897 by members of the Volunteer Corps, and today accepts male and female players at senior and junior levels. The club is affiliated with the Auckland Rugby Football Union.

In addition to the club's primary sport of rugby union, College Rifles is active in badminton, football 7's, netball, lacrosse, tennis and touch rugby.

All Blacks
College Rifles has produced five All Blacks, the most recent being Jon McLachlan, who played a single test match in 1974.

 Lyn Weston
 Viv Wilson
 Charlie Fletcher
 Reg Sheen
 Jon McLachlan

Honours
College Rifles have won the Auckland men's premier competition on two occasions, in 1919 and 1964.

External links
Club website
Auckland RFU club profile

References

Sport in Auckland
New Zealand rugby union teams